The University of Maryland neighborhood, encompasses a southwestern portion of downtown Baltimore which includes the University of Maryland, Baltimore.

References

Neighborhoods in Baltimore